The French Cellar is a wine subscription company based in Singapore.

History
The company was founded in 2013 by Vincent Morello and Eric Joubert. The wine bottles were selected by the sommelier Nicolas Rebut. It is one of the first online wine subscription companies in Asia.

In May 2019, the French Cellar announced through its Facebook page that operations ceased as of May 27th, and launched a process of voluntary liquidation. Deliveries had become irregular in the months before the closure, and some customers lost several hundred dollars in yearly subscriptions paid upfront.

The French Cellar was acquired by Wala Technology Pte Ltd in 2019 and became the Wala Club.

Description
The French Cellar specialized in delivering French wines to homes in Asia.

References

External links
 Official Website

Food and drink companies of Singapore
Wine retailers
Online retailers of Singapore